is a Japanese jurist and was a judge on the International Court of Justice from 1976 until 2003, when he retired. He served as Vice-President from 1991 to 1994.  His main area of expertise was law of the sea. He was born in Sapporo.

He earned his law degree from the University of Tokyo in 1947 and his doctorate in law from Yale Law School in 1953.

See also
 Nicaragua v. United States

External links

International Court of Justice judges
Japanese judges
People from Sapporo
1924 births
Possibly living people
University of Tokyo alumni
Yale Law School alumni
Academic staff of Tohoku University
Recipients of the Order of the Sacred Treasure, 1st class
Recipients of the Order of Culture
Japanese judges of United Nations courts and tribunals